Song for a Raggy Boy is an 2003 Irish historical drama film directed by Aisling Walsh. It is based on the book of the same name by Patrick Galvin and is based on true events.

Plot

In 1939, on the brink of World War II, the St. Judes Reformatory is a ruthless Irish school for boys. Grey, gloomy and ruled by the sadistic Brother John (Iain Glen), the school prefers punishment to rehabilitation. But new lay teacher William Franklin (Aidan Quinn), fresh from the frontline of the Spanish Civil War, fights to liberate the boys from their oppressors.

Patrick Delaney 743 (Chris Newman) arrives at the school aged 13 and a half. He, like all the boys, is allocated a number which the brothers use. Franklin, however, always uses the boys' names. Delaney is an attractive boy and he receives the unwelcome attentions of a pedophile brother, Brother Mac (Marc Warren), who molests and rapes the boy in the school toilets. The boy tells of his ordeal to a visiting priest in confession only to be told not to say a word to anyone. Word of Delaney's confession reaches Brother Mac who punishes the boy by forcing him under a cold shower naked, then giving him his clothes so they are also wet.

Liam Mercier 636 (John Travers). Mercier is one of the few boys who can read and write, but is otherwise a hard case. Franklin befriends the boy and interests him in poetry, some of it written by communist sympathisers. Mercier and Franklin both challenge the authority of Brother John - Mercier by protesting at the vicious beating of two brothers on Christmas Day, and Franklin by stepping in and actually stopping the whipping. Brother John bides his time and, having tricked Mercier into coming out of class, beats him continuously in front of Brother Mac in the refectory. Franklin is eventually told by Brother Mac that Mercier is in the refectory, after which Franklin discovers Mercier's dead body. He carries the corpse out of the room.

Livid, Franklin attacks Brother John, calling him a murderer. Brothers John and Mac are taken from the school by the Church authorities. At Mercier's funeral, Franklin tells the other boys that his death was murder, before kissing the coffin. Franklin decides he has to leave the school, but is persuaded to stay at the last minute when he is moved by Delaney reciting Eva Gore-Booth's poem "Comrades" across the playground. Franklin drops his bags and Delaney runs towards Franklin and jumps up to hug him while all the other boys gather round in love and affection for their saviour.

Production
The film took over four years to make because of difficulties getting it started; some were casting problems, others to do with raising finance. One casting problem was finding the ideal boy to play Liam Mercier, who the director felt was vital to cast well. Eventually they auditioned John Travers, a boy from an Irish boxing club with no previous acting experience.

Aidan Quinn had been attached to the script for two and a half years before production. It was filmed on location in County Cork and County Kerry in Ireland. The school scenes were filmed at Coláiste Iosagán, a former De La Salle college in Ballyvourney. It was an Irish/Danish/UK/Spanish co-production, and was produced with the support of investment incentives for the Irish film industry provided by the Government of Ireland.

Main cast

Aidan Quinn ... William Franklin   
Iain Glen ... Brother John    
Marc Warren ... Brother Mac  
Dudley Sutton ... Brother Tom    
Alan Devlin ... Father Damian  
Stuart Graham ... Brother Whelan   
John Travers ... Liam Mercier 636   
Chris Newman ... Patrick Delaney 743  
Andrew Simpson ... Gerard Peters 458

The Boys
Robert Sheehan ...O'Reilly 58
Caoimhin 'Tojo' Barra Doherty ...Murphy 388
Samuel Bright ...Ryan 126
Mark Butler...Downey 913
 Bernard Manning ...Rodgers 855
Michael McGee ...Lynch 76
John Collins ...O Connor 252
Michael Scott ...Flynn 144
Robert White ...Galvin 544
Michael Sloan ...Sean Peters 568

Reception 
On review aggregator Rotten Tomatoes, which categorizes reviews as positive or negative only, the film has an approval rating of 67% calculated based on 6 critics comments. By comparison, with the same opinions being calculated using a weighted arithmetic mean, the rating is 5,80/10.

In The Guardian, Peter Bradshaw rated it 2/5 stars saying, "it's a formula beloved since Nicholas Nickleby and Dotheboys Hall, but here given a new miserabilist anti-clerical spin and imbued with Hollywood-ised cliche of goodies and baddies. And the sugar-rush happy ending is just a joke."

In his review for Variety, David Rooney said that "director Aisling Walsh for the most part brings an admirably even-handed approach to brutal material in Song For a Raggy Boy (...) While the screenplay judiciously avoids blanket accusations by confining the truly sadistic behavior to one priest, the film underlines the moral fragility of the Church."

References

External links

2003 films
2003 drama films
Irish historical drama films
Danish historical drama films
Spanish historical drama films
English-language Irish films
English-language Spanish films
English-language Danish films
Films set in 1939
2003 in Christianity
Films based on Irish novels
Media coverage of Catholic Church sexual abuse scandals
Films about pedophilia
2000s English-language films
2000s historical drama films
Irish war films